Urban exploration (often shortened as UE, urbex and sometimes known as roof and tunnel hacking) is the exploration of manmade structures, usually abandoned ruins or hidden components of the manmade environment. Photography and historical interest/documentation are heavily featured in the hobby, sometimes involving trespassing onto private property. Urban exploration is also called draining (a specific form of urban exploration where storm drains or sewers are explored), urban spelunking, urban rock climbing, urban caving, building hacking, or mousing.

The activity presents various risks, including physical danger and, if done illegally and/or without permission, the possibility of arrest and punishment. Some activities associated with urban exploration violate local or regional laws and certain broadly interpreted anti-terrorism laws, or can be considered trespassing or invasion of privacy.

Exploration sites

Abandonments

Ventures into abandoned structures are perhaps the most common example of urban exploration. Many sites are entered first by locals and may have graffiti or other kinds of vandalism, while others are better preserved. Although targets of exploration vary from one country to another, high-profile abandonments include amusement parks, grain elevators, factories, power plants, missile silos, fallout shelters, hospitals, asylums, prisons, schools, poor houses, and sanatoriums.

In Bosnia and Herzegovina large underground facility abandoned since 1992 is Željava Air Base, situated under the  mountain, near the city of Bihać. It was the largest underground airport and military air base in the SFR Yugoslavia, and one of the largest in Europe. The complex contains tunnels in total length of 3.5 km (2.2 mi), and the bunker with four entrances protected by 100-ton pressurized doors, three of which were customized for use by fixed-wing aircraft. capable in housing two full fighter squadrons, one reconnaissance squadron, and associated maintenance facilities, including an underground water source, power generators, crew quarters, and other strategic military facilities. It also housed a mess hall that could feed 1,000 people simultaneously, along with spaces for storing food, fuel and arms sufficient to last 30 days. It was designed and built to sustain a direct hit from a 20-kiloton nuclear bomb, equivalent to that dropped on Nagasaki. Nowadays, it's popular for urban exploration, although it is risky due to the possibility of anti-personnel landmines being located in unexplored areas, remanence from 1990's Bosnian War.

Many explorers find the decay of uninhabited space profoundly beautiful, and some are also proficient freelance photographers who document what they see, such as those who document the infrastructure of the former USSR.

Abandoned sites are also popular among historians, preservationists, architects, archaeologists, industrial archaeologists, and ghost hunters.

Active buildings

Another aspect of urban exploration is the practice of exploring active or in use buildings, which includes gaining access to secured or "member-only" areas, mechanical rooms, roofs, elevator rooms, abandoned floors, and other normally unseen parts of working buildings. The term "infiltration" is often associated with exploring active structures. People entering restricted areas may be committing trespass, and civil prosecution may result.

Catacombs

Catacombs such as those found in Paris, Rome, Odessa, and Naples have been investigated by urban explorers. Some consider the Mines of Paris, comprising many of the tunnels that are not open to public tours, including the catacombs, the "Holy Grail" due to their extensive nature and history. Explorers of these spaces are known as cataphiles.

Sewers and storm drains

Entry into storm drains, or "draining", is another common form of urban exploration. Groups devoted to the task have arisen, such as the Cave Clan in Australia. Draining has a specialized set of guidelines, the foremost of which is "When it rains, no drains!", because the dangers of becoming entrapped, washed away, or killed increase dramatically during heavy rainfall.

A small subset of explorers enter sanitary sewers. Sometimes they are the only connection to caves or other subterranean features. Sewers are among the most dangerous locations to explore owing to the risk of poisoning by buildups of toxic gas (commonly methane, hydrogen sulfide, or carbon dioxide). Sewers can contain viruses, bacteria, protozoa, and parasitic worms. Protective equipment is recommended for people who enter sewers.

Transit tunnels

Exploring active and abandoned subway and railway tunnels, bores, and stations is often considered trespassing and can result in civil prosecution due to security concerns. As a result, this type of exploration is rarely publicized. An exception to this is the abandoned subway of Rochester, New York, the only American city with an abandoned subway system that was once operational. The Cincinnati subway is also abandoned but was never completed. London has a number of stations on the London Underground network that have been closed over the years, with Aldwych tube station a popular location for explorers.

Utility tunnels

Universities, and other large institutions, such as hospitals, often distribute hazardous superheated steam for heating or cooling buildings from a central heating plant. These pipes are generally run through utility tunnels, which are often intended to be accessible solely for the purposes of maintenance. Nevertheless, many of these steam tunnels, especially those on college campuses, have a tradition of exploration by students. This practice was once called "vadding" at the Massachusetts Institute of Technology, but students there now call it roof and tunnel hacking.

Some steam tunnels have dirt floors, poor lighting and temperatures above . Others have concrete floors, bright light, and more moderate temperatures. Most steam tunnels have large intake fans to bring in the fresh air and push the hot air out the back, and these may start without warning. Most active steam tunnels do not contain airborne asbestos, but proper breathing protection may be required for other respiratory hazards. Experienced explorers are very cautious inside active utility tunnels since pipes can spew boiling hot water or steam from leaky valves or pressure relief blow-offs. Often there are puddles of muddy water on the floor, making slips and falls a special concern near hot pipes.

Steam tunnels have generally been secured more heavily in recent years due to their frequent use for carrying communications network backbone cables, increased safety and liability concerns, and perceived risk of use in terrorist activities.

Popularity
The rise in urban exploration's popularity can be attributed to increased media attention. Recent television shows such as Urban Explorers on the Discovery Channel, MTV's Fear, and the Ghost Hunting exploits of The Atlantic Paranormal Society have packaged the hobby for a popular audience. The fictional film After... (2006), a hallucinatory thriller set in Moscow's underground subways, features urban explorers caught up in extreme situations. Talks and exhibits on urban exploration have appeared at the fifth and sixth Hackers on Planet Earth Conference, complementing numerous newspaper articles and interviews.

Another source of popular information is Cities of the Underworld, a documentary series that ran for three seasons on the History Channel starting in 2007.  This series roamed around the world, showing little-known underground structures in remote locales and right under the feet of densely packed city-dwellers. Websites for professional and hobby explorers have been developed to share tips and locations.

With the rise in the hobby's popularity, there has been increasing discussion of whether the extra attention has been beneficial.

Legality 

The activity's growing popularity has resulted in increased attention not just from explorers but also from vandals and law enforcement. The illicit aspects of urban exploring, which may include trespassing and breaking and entering, have had critical attention in mainstream newspapers.

In Australia, lawyers for the Roads and Traffic Authority of New South Wales shut down the Sydney Cave Clan's website after they raised concerns that the portal could "risk human safety and threaten the security of its infrastructure". Another website belonging to the Bangor Explorers Guild was criticized by the Maine State Police for encouraging behavior that "could get someone hurt or killed". Toronto Police, called for an "end" to rooftop photography in 2016, citing similar concerns about the possibility of death or injury.The Toronto Transit Commission has used the Internet to crimp subway tunnel explorations, going as far as to send investigators to various explorers' homes.

Jeff Chapman, who authored Infiltration, writes that genuine urban explorers "never vandalize, steal or damage anything". The thrill comes from "discovery and a few nice pictures". Some explorers also request permission for entry in advance.

Hazards 
Storm drains are not designed with human access as their primary use and can be subject to flash flooding and bad air.

Many abandoned structures have hazards such as unstable structures, unsafe floors, broken glass, stray voltage, entrapment hazards, or unknown chemicals and other harmful substances (most notably asbestos). Other risks include freely roaming guard dogs and hostile squatters. Some abandoned locations may be heavily guarded by motion detectors and active security patrols, while others are more easily accessible and carry less risk of discovery.

Injuries and deaths

Rooftopping

Rooftopping and skywalking are the ascents of rooftops, cranes, antennas, smokestacks, etc., usually illegally, to get an adrenaline rush and take selfie photos or videos. Rooftopping differs from skywalking as the latter is mostly about taking panoramic photographs of the scene below, and safety is more important than the thrill. Rooftopping has been especially popular in Russia.Buildering has a similar goal as rooftopping and skywalking (to reach the roof), but involves climbing the building from the outside rather than infiltrating from the inside.

Methods and technology 
Some urban explorers use action cameras such as GoPro or other helmet cameras for videos.

Some also use quadcopter drones for exploration and recording.

The location-based games Ingress and the following Pokémon Go based on the former have urban exploration elements. While some are concerned with keeping certain sites secret from the public at large, mainly to prevent vandalism, several apps dedicated to urban exploration exist.

See also

 24 Hour Fort challenge, an internet challenge which incorporates elements of urban exploration and involves participants attempting to hide inside buildings, often after they close in the evening
 Dead malls
 Exploration
 Jane's Walk
 List of graffiti and street art injuries and deaths
 Miru Kim – an artist who documents urban explorations
 Modern ruins
 MONU – magazine on urbanism
 Roof and tunnel hacking
 Ruins photography
 Unfinished building

References

Further reading 
 Timothy Hannem, Urbex : 50 lieux secrets et abandonnés en France, Arthaud, 

 Gates, Moses (2012). Hidden Cities: Travels to the Secret Corners of the World's Great Metropolises; A Memoir of Urban Exploration Tarcher, New York. 
 
 Margaine, Sylvain (2009) Forbidden Places: Exploring Our Abandoned Heritage (Hardcover), 
 Ninjalicious (2005). Access All Areas: A user's guide to the art of urban exploration. PO Box 13, Station E, Toronto, ON M6H 4E1 Canada: Infilpress. 
 Paiva, Troy (2008) Night Vision: The Art of Urban Exploration Chronicle Books 
 Melody Gilbert's Urban Explorers: Into the Darkness (2007), a documentary about some of the world's urban explorers.

External links

UER Urban Exploration Resource
 on YouTube.

 
Adventure travel
Subterranea (geography)
Hobbies
Backpacking
Exploration
Psychogeography